Phthora nenano (Medieval Greek: , also νενανώ) is the name of one of the two "extra" modes in the Byzantine Octoechos—an eight mode system, which was proclaimed by a synod of . The phthorai nenano and nana were favoured by composers at the Monastery Agios Sabas, near Jerusalem, while hymnographers at the Stoudiou-Monastery obviously preferred the diatonic mele.

The phthora nenano as part of the Hagiopolitan octoechos 
Today the system of eight diatonic modes and two  ("destroyers") is regarded as the modal system of Byzantine chant, and during the eighth century it became also model for the Latin tonaries—introductions into a proper diatonic eight mode system and its psalmody, created by Frankish cantores during the Carolinigian reform. While φθορά νενανῶ was often called "chromatic", the second  was named "nana" (gr. φθορά νανὰ) and called "enharmonic", the names were simply taken from the syllables used for the intonation (enechema).  The two  were regarded as two proper modes, but also used as transposition or alteration signs. Within the diatonic modes of the octoechos they cause a change into another (chromatic or enharmonic) genus (metavoli kata genos).

The treatise itself can be dated back to the ninth century, when it introduced the book of tropologion, a collection of troparic and heirmologic hymns which was ordered according to the eight-week cycle of the octoechos. The first paragraph of the treatise maintains, that it was written by John of Damascus.

.

For the songs in this book eight Echoi are said to be necessary. But this is not true and should be rejected. In fact the Plagios of Deuteros is mostly sung as Mesos Deuteros—e.g. «», the «» and other pieces written by Master Cosmas and Master John of Damascus "from the Mousike". (If, however, you try to sing the compositions of Master Joseph and others "with the Mousike", they will not fit, having not been composed "according to the Mousike"). For these cases we can see that ten Echoi are used (for the repertory of this book) and not eight, only.

The author of the treatise wrote obviously during or after the time of Joseph and his brother Theodore the Studite, when the use the mesos forms, phthorai nenano and nana were no longer popular. The word "mousike" referred an autochthonous theory during the 8th century used by the generation of John of Damascus and Cosmas of Maiuma at Mar Saba, because it was independent from ancient Greek music.

As an introduction of the tropologion it had to integrate the mele composed in these  within the octoechos order and its weekly cycles. Since they had their own mele and compositions like the other echoi, they were subordinated to the eight diatonic  according to the pitches or degrees of the mode of their cadences.

.
They were called Phthorai (i.e. destroyers), because they begin from their own Echoi, but the thesis of their cadences and formulas are on notes (phthongoi) from other Echoi.

They had to be classified according to a certain echos of the eight-week cycle by adding the intonation "nenano" to the intonation of the main diatonic echos (usually abbreviated by a modal signature).

The use of phthora nenano in the psaltic art 

In the period of the psaltic art (gr. ψαλτικὴ τέχνη, "the art of chant", 1261–1750) the Late Byzantine Notation used four additional phthorai for each mode, including the eight diatonic , in order to indicate the precise moment of a transposition (metavoli kata tonon). The former system of sixteen echoi (4 , 4 , 4 , and 4 ) which was still used in the old books of the cathedral rite (asmatikon, kontakarion, etc.), was replaced by the Hagiopolitan octoechos and its two . The new book  which replaced the former book and established a mixed rite in Constantinople, introduced into eight diatonic echoi and two phthorai. Hence, it became necessary to distinguish between the proper echos and its phthora, nenano and nana as "extra modes", and their use for temporary changes within the melos of a certain diatonic echos.

The use of six phthorai for all of the ten Hagiopolitan echoi 

The diatonic  was no longer the destruction of the diatonic modes and its genus, and its tonal system, it could change each mode and its  into another echos by a simple transposition. Hence, the list of  mentioned in each Papadikai, was simply a catalogue of transposition signs, which were written over that  where the transposition has to be done.

Phthora nenano and the plagal second echos 

The living tradition today still respects this rule, since  of the  has become the same like :  (D).

The early Persian and Latin reception 

Already in the thirteenth century, there were interval descriptions in Latin and Arabic treatises which proved that the use of the chromatic  was common not only among Greek psaltes.

Quţb al-Dīn al-Shīrīz distinguished two ways of using the chromatic genus in parde hiğāzī, named after a region of the Arabian Peninsula. The exact proportions were used during changes to the diatonic genus. In both diatonic and chromatic divisions the ring finger fret of the oud keyboard was used. It had the proportion 22:21—between middle and ring finger fret—and was called after the Baghdadi oud player Zalzal. These are the proportions, presented as a division of a tetrachord using the proportions of 22:21 and 7:6:

12:11 x 7:6 x 22:21 = 4:3  (approximate intervals in cents:  151, 267, 80 = 498)

This Persian treatise is the earliest source which tried to measure the exact proportions of a chromatic mode, which can be compared with historical descriptions of phthora nenano.

In his voluminous music treatise Jerome of Moravia described that "Gallian cantores" used to mix the diatonic genus with chromatic and the enharmonic, despite the use of the two latter were excluded according to Latin theorists:

Especially when they mix the ecclesiastical chant with the organum mode, they like not only to abandon the first mode [simple plainchant in monophonic realization?], but the confusion of both [plainchant and ars organi] includes another [confusion of the diatonic] with the other genera, because they associate the enharmonic diesis and the chromatic trihemitonium with the diatonic genus. They replace the semitonium by the tonus and vice versa, in doing so they differ from the other nations, as far as chant is concerned.

During the seventies of the thirteenth century Jerome met the famous singers in Paris who were well skilled in the artistic performance of ars organi, which is evident by the chant manuscripts of the Abbey Saint-Maur-des-Fossés, of the Abbey Saint-Denis, and of the Notre Dame school. Despite the fact that no other Latin treatise ever mentioned that the singers were allowed to use enharmonic or chromatic intervals, and certainly not the transposition practice which was used sometimes by Greek psaltes, they obviously felt free enough to use both during the improvisation of organum—and probably, they became so familiar with the described enharmonic chromaticism, that they even used it during the monophonic performance of plainchant. Jerome as an educated listener regarded it as a "confusion" between monophonic and polyphonic performance style. Whatever his opinion about the performance style of Parisian cantores, the detailed description fit well to the use of the phthora nenano as an "echos kratema", as it was mentioned in the later Greek treatises after the end of the Byzantine Empire.

The phthora nenano as kyrios echos and echos kratema 

.

There are two phthorai which can be sung as those [of the Octoechos]: νανὰ and νενανὼ. There are also the phthorai of the other [kyrioi] echoi, but those are not as perfect [they have no proper melos like nana and nenano?], because they just cause a temporary transition [] from one to another echos, while the former have been used by composers of various epochs to create kratemata like they were [independent] kyrioi echoi. Hence, it is justified to call them rather "perfect echoi" than just "phthorai".

Kratemata were longer sections sung with abstract syllables in a faster tempo. As a disgression used within other forms in papadic or kalophonic chant genres—soloistic like cherubim chant or a sticheron kalophonikon. From a composer's point of view who composed within the mele of the octoechos, a kratema could not only recapitulate the modal structure of its model, but also create a change into another (chromatic or enharmonic) genus.

Gabriel Hieromonachus (mid fifteenth century) already mentioned that the "nenano phone"—the characteristic step (interval) of nenano—seemed to be in some way halved. On folio 5 verso of the quoted treatise (EBE 899), the author gave a similar description of the intervals used with the intonation formula νε–να–νὼ, and it fitted very well to the description that Jerome gave 300 years ago while he was listening to Parisian singers:

Αὕτη ἡ φθορὰ εἰς τὰς ἀνιούσας. Ἰδοὺ γὰρ εἶπε τοῦ νω τὴν φωνὴν τὴν ἥμισυ εἰς τὸ να.

Please note, what is called "phthora": phthora is called, if you make a half phonic step in descending [direction], (or more precisely a third of it, while [the second interval] has an ascending) one and a half, as in nenano. Listen:

 [ison]— [dikentimata: small tone]— [oligon: one and a half of the great tone]— [oligon with diple: diesis or quarter tone]

This is the intonation of phthora which is ascending. Concerning the final phonic step [which was a third of tonus in a descending melos], half of it is now part of the [second] να step [] and the rest [interval is sung] on νω!

The upper small tone leading to the final note of the protos, has a slightly different intonation with respect to the melodic movement, at least according to the practice among educated psaltes of the Ottoman Empire during the eighteenth century. But Gabriel Hieromonachos described already in the fifteenth century, that the singers tend to stray away from their original intonation while they were singing the melos of phthora nenano:

.

Because when we sing a nenano melody, we don’t end on the tone, from which we started, but if you look at it closer, you will find that we come down to a somewhat lower pitch. The reason for this is the nenano interval; for it seems to be in some way halved, even if we are not aware of it; in other words, we perform the nenano intervals weakly in upward direction, in order to give the characteristic colour of nenano, but in downward direction [we perform them] correctly, and this causes the melody to get out of tune.

Actual usage and meaning 

Later use of the enechema (initial incantation formula) of nenano as well as the phthora (alteration and transposition sign) of nenano in manuscripts makes it clear that it is associated with the main form of the second plagal mode as it survives in the current practice of Byzantine (Greek Orthodox) chant. Furthermore, the phthora sign of nenano has survived in the nineteenth-century neo-Byzantine notation system which is still used to switch between a diatonic and chromatic intonation of the tetrachord one fourth below.

Chrysanthos' exegesis of the phthora nenano 

The common modern enechema places the tetrachord likewise:

Chrysanthos' exegeseis of the devteros echoi

The hard chromatic plagios devteros 

Chrysanthos of Madytos offered following exegesis of the traditional echema  which was originally diatonic, but it is currently sung with the chromatic nenano intonation (see  in Chrysanthos' parallage).

Chrysanthos' exegesis employed the concluding cadence formula of the chromatic  which was obviously an exegesis based on psaltic rules, as Manual Chrysaphes had once mentioned them.

He described the correct intonation as follows:

§. 245.  3:12.

The chromatic scale: D πα—[high E flat]—[high F sharp]—G δι—a κε—[high b flat]—[high c sharp]—d πα', consists of two tetrachords. In each tetrachords the hemitones are placed in a way, that the interval D πα—E βου [ὕφεσις] is the same as a κε—b ζω' [ὕφεσις], Ε βου [ὕφεσις]—F sharp γα [δίεσις] is the same as b ζω' [ὕφεσις]—c sharp νη' [δίεσις], and F sharp γα [δίεσις]—G δι is the same as c sharp νη' [δίεσις]—d πα', so that both tetarchords, D πα—G δ and a κε—d πα', are unisono. This means that the interval D πα—E βου [ὕφεσις] is unisono with the small tone (ἐλάχιστος τόνος), Ε βου [ὕφεσις]—F sharp γα [δίεσις] with the trihemitone, and F sharp γα [δίεσις]—G δι with the hemitone: 3:12—a quarter of the great tone (μείζων τόνος) [7+18+3=28].

Despite of this tradition modern music teachers tried to translate this sophisticated intonation on a modern piano keyboard as "a kind of gipsy-minor."

The soft chromatic kyrios devteros 
Here according Chrysanthos of Madytos the exegesis of the traditional  intonation can be sung like this:

He explained that the intonation of the modern  was not based on tetraphonia, but on trichords or diphonia:

§. 244. 

.

The chromatic scale C νη—[D flat]—E βου—F γα—G δι—[a flat]—b ζω'—c νη' is not made of tetrachords, but of trichords which are absolutely equal and conjunct with each other—in this way:
C νη—[D flat]—E βου, E βου—F γα—G δι, G δι—[a flat]—b ζω', b ζω'—c νη'—d πα'
If the scale starts on G δι, and it moves towards the lower, the step G δι—F γα requests the interval of a great tone (μείζων τόνος) and the step F γα—E βου a small tone (ἐλάχιστος τόνος); likewise the step E βου—[D flat] πα [ὕφεσις] an interval of μείζων τόνος, and the step πα [ὕφεσις] [D flat]—C νη one of ἐλάχιστος τόνος. When the direction is towards the higher, the step G δι—[a flat] κε [ὕφεσις] requests the interval of a small tone and [a flat] κε [ὕφεσις]—b ζω' that of a great tone; likewise the step b ζω'—c νη' an interval of ἐλάχιστος τόνος, and the step c νη'—Cd πα one of μείζων τόνος. Among the phthongoi of this chromatic scale only the phthongoi βου, γα, and δι can be identified with the same phthongoi of the diatonic scale, while the others are moveable degrees of the mode. While this scale extends between E βου and C νη over one great and one small tone [12+7=19], the diatonic scale extends from the middle (ἐλάσσων τόνος) to the great tone (μείζων τόνος) [12+9=21], for the interval between G δι and b ζω' it is the same.

Phthora nenano as an "Ottoman corruption" 
Because of its early status as one of the two mysterious extra modes in the system, nenano has been subject of much attention in Byzantine and post-Byzantine music theory. Papadikai like the manuscript EBE 899 and other late Byzantine manuscripts associate nenano and nana with the chromatic and the enharmonic genus, one of the three genera of tuning during Classical antiquity that fell into early misuse because of its complexity. If the phthora nenano was already chromatic during the 9th century, including the use of one enharmonic diesis, is still a controversial issue, but medieval Arabic, Persian and Latin authors like Jerome of Moravia rather hint to the possibility that it was.

Greek music theoreticians such as Simon Karas continue up to the end of the twentieth century to regard the intonation nenano as "exotic," although they do not always agree, whether the  intonation is hard or soft chromatic. Anonymous authors like the one of the 16th-century Papadike (EBE 899) maintained, that one of the minor tones in the tetrachord of nenano should be either smaller or larger than a tempered semitone, approaching the smallest interval of a third or a quarter of a tone. The banishment of instrumental musical practice and its theory from the tradition of Byzantine chant has made it very difficult to substantiate any such claims experimentally, and traditional singers use different intonations depending on their school. The only possible conclusions can be drawn indirectly and tentatively through comparisons with the tradition of Ottoman instrumental court music, which important church theoreticians such as the Kyrillos Marmarinos, Archbishop of Tinos considered a necessary complement to liturgical chant. However, Ottoman court music and its theory are also complex and diverging versions of modes exist according to different schools, ethnic traditions or theorists. There, one encounters various versions of the "nenano" tetrachord, both with a narrow and with a wider minor second either at the top or at the bottom, depending on the interval structure of the scale beyond the two ends of the tetrachord.

Although the phthora nenano is already known as one of two additional phthorai used within the Hagiopolitan octoechos, its chromaticism was often misunderstood as a late corruption of Byzantine chant during the Ottoman Empire, but recent comparisons with medieval Arabic treatises proved that this exchange can dated back to a much earlier period, when Arab music was created as a synthesis of Persian music and Byzantine chant of Damascus.

Notes

References

Sources

Editions of Music Theory Treatises

Studies 

.

External links 

Byzantine music theory
Modes (music)